"Song for Athene" (also known as "Alleluia. May Flights of Angels Sing Thee to Thy Rest") is a musical composition by British composer John Tavener with lyrics by Mother Thekla, an Orthodox nun, which is intended to be sung a cappella by a four-part (soprano, alto, tenor and bass) choir. It is Tavener's best known work, having been performed by the Westminster Abbey Choir conducted by Martin Neary at the funeral service of Diana, Princess of Wales, on 6 September 1997 as her cortège departed from Westminster Abbey.

Commissioned by the BBC, the piece was written in April 1993 by Tavener as a tribute to Athene Hariades, a young half-Greek actress who was a family friend killed in a cycling accident. At the time that she died, Athene Hariades was working as a teacher of English and Drama at the Hellenic College of London. Tavener said of Hariades: "Her beauty, both outward and inner, was reflected in her love of acting, poetry, music and of the Orthodox Church." He had heard her reading Shakespeare in Westminster Abbey, and after her funeral, developed the idea of composing a song which combined words from the Orthodox funeral service and Shakespeare's Hamlet. The work was published by Chester Music in 1997.

Music and lyrics
"Song for Athene", which has a performance time of about seven minutes, is an elegy consisting of the Hebrew word alleluia ("let us praise the LORD") sung monophonically six times as an introduction to texts excerpted and modified from the funeral service of the Eastern Orthodox Church and from Shakespeare's Hamlet (probably 1599–1601). The lyrics were written by Mother Thekla (18 July 1918 – 7 August 2011), an Orthodox nun who co-founded the Orthodox Monastery of the Assumption near Whitby, North Yorkshire, and whom Tavener called his "spiritual mother". Tavener had come away from the funeral of Athene Hariades with the music of Song for Athene fully formed in his mind. He called Mother Thekla the same day, and said to her: "I want words." She sent him the lyrics by post, which arrived the next day.

The music reaches a climax after the sixth intonation of alleluia with the lines "Weeping at the grave creates the song: Alleluia. Come, enjoy rewards and crowns I have prepared for you." Alleluia is then sung a seventh time as a coda. Following the example of traditional Byzantine music, a continuous ison or drone underlies the work.

Significant recordings
The song has appeared on, among others, a number of recordings of Tavener's work by various choirs, including Ikons (Cala, 1994) by the BBC Singers, Tavener: Innocence (Classics, 1995) by the Westminster Abbey Choir, John Tavener: Byzantia (Classical, 1999) by the Winchester Cathedral Choir, John Tavener: Song for Athene, Svyati and Other Choral Works (Naxos Records, 2000) by the Choir of St John's College, Cambridge, The John Tavener Collection (Universal Classics Group, 2003) by the Choir of the Temple Church and the Holst Singers, and Ikon (Decca, 2006) by The Sixteen.

The Westminster Abbey Choir's performance of the work at the funeral of Diana, Princess of Wales, appears in a recording of the service released by the BBC as Diana, Princess of Wales, 1961–1997: The BBC Recording of the Funeral Service (Uni/London Classics, 1997).

In 2007, Scottish violinist Nicola Benedetti released an album entitled Nicola Benedetti: Vaughan Williams; Tavener which contained an arrangement of the song for solo violin and string orchestra.

Notes

References
.
.
Tavener's The Beautiful Names, the programme of a concert by the BBC Symphony Orchestra, BBC Symphony Chorus and Trinity College of Music Chamber Choir at the Birmingham Town Hall on 15 March 2008.

Further reading

Musical score
.

Articles
.
.
.

Audiovisual material
 – in a programme called Manifestations of God on the DVD, Tavener speaks about his choral music, and the parents of Athene Hariades talk about the inspiration behind "Song for Athene".

External links 
John Tavener: Song for Athene - Gabrieli Consort - Paul McCreesh

1993 compositions
A cappella songs
Choral compositions
Christian songs
Classical music in the United Kingdom
Compositions by John Tavener
Eastern Orthodox liturgical music
Funerary and memorial compositions
Works based on Hamlet